Ollie "Dink" Johnson (1892 – November 29, 1954 was a Dixieland jazz pianist, clarinetist, and drummer.

Background
Johnson was born in 1892, most likely in New Orleans, although the date is disputed and some sources have cited the place of birth as Biloxi, Mississippi. His mother, Hattie, was unmarried and his father's name is unknown. His elder half-brother was double bassist William Manuel "Bill" Johnson. He worked around Mississippi and New Orleans before moving to the western United States in the early 1910s. He played around Nevada and California, often with his brother Bill. He played with the Original Creole Orchestra, mostly on drums.

Johnson made his first recordings in 1922 on clarinet with Kid Ory's Band. He made more recordings in the 1940s and 1950s, mostly on piano, although also doing some one-man band recordings, playing all three of his instruments through over dubbing. Johnson's piano style was influenced by Jelly Roll Morton (the common-law husband of Johnson's half-sister, Bessie, known as Anita Gonzales). Dink's clarinet playing was influenced by Larry Shields. Johnson wrote tunes, including "The Krooked Blues" (recorded by King Oliver) and "So Different Blues".

Johnson died in Portland, Oregon in 1954, aged 62.

References

1892 births
1954 deaths
Date of birth unknown
African-American pianists
American blues pianists
American male pianists
American jazz clarinetists
American jazz drummers
American jazz pianists
Dixieland clarinetists
Dixieland drummers
Dixieland pianists
20th-century American drummers
American male drummers
20th-century American male musicians
American male jazz musicians
20th-century American pianists
20th-century African-American musicians